Lilly the Witch: The Dragon and the Magic Book is a 2009 German children's film directed by Stefan Ruzowitzky. It is a partly animated comic fantasy based on the books by Knister, who co-wrote the screenplay.

Plot
The old witch Surulunda orders little clumsy dragon Hector to find a successor for her. Bringing along a magical book, Hector flies into the room of the young girl Lilly. She agrees to be the new witch, and has to prove her fitness for the job during a probationary period of 99 hours. She has to deal with evil warlock Jerome and his Pug minion who wants to steal the book, which he wants to use to taking over the world. For this purpose he tricks people into looking into his eyes, so that he can hypnotize them. The victims, including Lilly's mother, start to behave oddly and dress in grey.

Lilly and her little brother Leon often quarrel, but when Jerome kidnaps Leon and demands the book for his release, Lilly gives up the book temporarily. The two, together with two boys from school, succeed in recapturing it, thus saving the world from Jerome's control. This also improves Lilly's relationship with Leon.

Cast
 Pilar Bardem as Surulunda
 Michael Mittermeier (voice) as Hector
 Alina Freund as Lilly
 Ingo Naujoks as Jerome (Hieronymus)
 Sami Herzog as Leon
 Anja Kling as Mother

See also 
 Lilly the Witch: The Journey to Mandolan, a sequel film
 Lilli the Witch, the book series
 Lilly the Witch, the television series

References

External links
 

2009 films
2000s children's comedy films
2000s fantasy comedy films
German fantasy comedy films
German children's comedy films
2000s German-language films
Walt Disney Pictures films
Films with live action and animation
Films about dragons
Films about witchcraft
2000s children's fantasy films
Films based on children's books
2009 comedy films
Films directed by Stefan Ruzowitzky
2000s German films
German children's fantasy films